Mahmoud al-Ayyubi (1932 – October 11, 2013) was a Syrian-Kurdish politician born to a prominent political family in Damascus, Syria.

Career
He served as Deputy Prime Minister and Minister of Education from 1970 to 1971 in the Hafez al-Assad Government.

Al-Ayyubi served as Prime Minister of Syria from 21 December 1972 to 7 August 1976 under the presidency of Hafez Al-Asad.

He also served as Vice President of Syria from February 1971 to August 1976 ,Vice-President of the National Progressive Front, Minister of Education, member of the National Command of the Baath Party, and member of the National Command until his death in October 2013.

References

1932 births
2013 deaths
People from Damascus
Vice presidents of Syria
Prime Ministers of Syria
Syrian Kurdish politicians
Syrian Kurdish people
Members of the Regional Command of the Arab Socialist Ba'ath Party – Syria Region
Al-Ayoubi family

Syrian ministers of education